Puy de Sancy is the highest mountain in the Massif Central. It is part of an ancient stratovolcano which has been inactive for about 220,000 years.

The northern and southern slopes are used for skiing, and a number of cablecars and skilifts ascend the mountain. Skiing has been practised on the mountain since the early 20th century. Two local priests traversed the Puy de Sancy on skis in 1905. In 1936, a cable car link was built from Mont-Dore to one of the needles just below the summit. In December 1965, a cable car accident injured ten passengers and killed seven others. Super-Besse is another ski resort, located on the southwestern slope.

The valley to the north is also the source of two streams called Dore and Dogne, which unite to form the Dordogne, which flows through the nearby spa town of Mont-Dore and on to the Gironde estuary.

References

Sources
 .

External links

 The Sancy Ski Area

Landforms of Puy-de-Dôme
Inactive volcanoes
Landforms of Auvergne-Rhône-Alpes
Massif Central
Mountains of Auvergne-Rhône-Alpes
Pleistocene volcanoes
Stratovolcanoes of Metropolitan France
Tourist attractions in Puy-de-Dôme